Dillon Mitchell (born October 3, 2003) is an American college basketball player for the Texas Longhorns of the Big 12 Conference. He was a consensus five-star recruit and one of the top players in the 2022 class.

High school career
Mitchell originally attended Sickles High School in Citrus Park, Florida for his freshman and sophomore year, then transferred to Bishop McLaughlin Catholic High School in Spring Hill, Florida for his junior year before lastly transferring to Montverde Academy in Montverde, Florida prior to his senior year. He was selected to play in the 2022 McDonald's All-American Boys Game and the Jordan Brand Classic. He was the MVP of the Jordan Brand Classic after leading all scorers with 18 points.

Recruiting
Mitchell was a consensus five-star recruit and one of the top players in the 2022 class, according to major recruiting services. On October 25, 2021, he is committed to playing college basketball for Texas over offers from Florida State and Tennessee.

References

External links
Texas Longhorns bio
Montverde Academy Eagles bio
USA Basketball bio

2003 births
Living people
American men's basketball players
Basketball players from Tampa, Florida
McDonald's High School All-Americans
Montverde Academy alumni
Small forwards
Texas Longhorns men's basketball players